Gravity control may refer to one of the following: 
Anti-gravity
Gravity shielding
United States gravity control propulsion research